Biljana Pavićević (Serbian Cyrillic: Биљана Павићевић; born 17 June 1980) is a Montenegrin women's basketball player. She played for the French team Tarbes Gespe Bigorre.

References

External links
Profile at eurobasket.com
Profile at bgbasker.com

1980 births
Living people
Sportspeople from Nikšić
Montenegrin women's basketball players
Power forwards (basketball)
ŽKK Vojvodina players